Back Channel is a canal in the Port of Long Beach, California, United States, and is nearby to Terminal Island, Island Grissom, and Thenard. It is also close to the port's East Basin and the Gerald Desmond Bridge.

See also
 Long Beach Naval Shipyard

External links
 Location on Map Carta

Canals in California
Transportation buildings and structures in Los Angeles County, California
Bodies of water of Los Angeles County, California